Mervyn Adrian Cardoza (1922 – 2010, Toronto) was a one star general in the Pakistan Army. In 1965  Brig. Mervyn Cardoza was awarded the Tamgha-e-Khidmat by President Ayub Khan.

Background and family
He was first educated at St Patrick's High School, Karachi. Cardoza attended St. George's College, Mussoorie from where he graduated in 1944. He had three sons, Chris, Bruce and Geof. He had nine grandchildren.

Career
Following graduation, he joined the Army, and at the time of partition opted to serve in the Pakistan Army.
He quickly moved up the ranks until retiring at the rank of Brigadier.

Cardoza who was commanding 5 Armoured Brigade until 1970, left to take over the new post of Director Logistics in 1971.

After retiring from the Army he migrated to Canada.

Death
Cardoza died In Toronto, Canada on 17 November 2010.  A Funeral Mass was celebrated on 20 November at Holy Spirit Catholic Church, Toronto.

References

Pakistani Roman Catholics
Pakistan Army officers
St. Patrick's High School, Karachi alumni
1921 births
2010 deaths
Pakistani emigrants to Canada
Naturalized citizens of Canada
Canadian Roman Catholics
Military personnel from Karachi